Dr. Elizabeth Anita Widjaja (born 1951) is a Senior Principal Researcher of bamboo taxonomy at the Herbarium Bogoriense, Botany Division, Biological Research Centre at the Indonesian Institute of Sciences in Bogor, Indonesia.
She is especially interested in Indonesian bamboo and Malesian bamboo generally, and promotes the cultivation of bamboo for the prevention of erosion.

Dr. Widjaja recently said, of bamboo as a source of biofuel, that:

Bambusa lako (Timor black bamboo) was described and separated from the Indonesian black bamboo species Gigantochloa atroviolacea by Professor Widjaja in 1997, as its appearance (morphology) differed.

Books 

 Identikit jenis-jenis bambu di Jawa (Bamboo varieties found on Java) w/Kartikasari, S. N. (Sri Nurani), 2001, 
 Identikit jenis-jenis bambu di Kepulauan Sunda Kecil (Bamboo varieties of the Lesser Sunda Islands) w/Kartikasari, S. N. (Sri Nurani), 2001,

Awards 

 World Biodiversity Day Award, 1999, by the Indonesian State Ministry of Environment
 Indonesian President Award, 2000
 Harsberger Medal, for ethnobotanical studies (by the Society of the Ethnobotanist, India), 2001

References 

Taxon authorities
Botanists active in Asia
Living people
1951 births
20th-century botanists
Women botanists
Agrostologists
Women in forestry
Forestry in Indonesia
Bamboo
Indonesian women scientists
Indonesian biologists